Nagarchal is a supposed but unattested language of central India, presumed to be Dravidian (which would make it a South-Central Dravidian language). According to the 1971 census, there were 7,100 speakers of the language, but they have since apparently shifted to Hindi and Gondi. The Nagarchi people, who formerly spoke it, are found in the Balaghat, Chhindwara, Jabalpur, Mandla and Seoni districts of Madhya Pradesh.

References

Further reading 
A sociolinguistic survey among the Nagarchi community of central India

Agglutinative languages
Unattested languages of Asia
Languages extinct in the 20th century

sv:Gond#Dialekter